Neil Adrian Denis Laughton (born 31 October 1963) is a former army officer, entrepreneur and adventurer.  He has completed the Explorers Grand Slam of climbing the highest mountains on all seven continents and reaching both the North and South Poles.  He holds a number of records for his activities on land, sea and air.

Personal life 
Neil A D Laughton was born in Woolwich, London on 31 October 1963, the eldest son of Captain RFG Laughton (Royal Navy) and Gillian E Cocks. Laughton grew up in rural Somerset and went to boarding school in Sussex (Worth Abbey).  Upon leaving school in 1982 Neil joined the Royal Marines.

Laughton married Caroline Reay-Jones in 2006; they live in Sussex with their three children.

Military service 
He was commissioned into the Royal Marines at the age of 19 on 28 April 1983 and won the coveted Green Beret but resigned his commission in July 1984 after his father died from cancer. After a spell in the corporate world, Laughton volunteered for Selection into the 21st Special Air Service Regiment (Artists) (Reserve) in 1991 and was awarded his sandy coloured beret with famous winged dagger logo bearing the motto "Who Dares Wins". He was awarded his parachute wings in 1992, completed the Explosives and Demolitions course at Hereford and was commissioned at the Royal Military Academy Sandhurst on 6 August 1995. He served in A Sqn, 21 SAS as a Troop Commander until 2003 before resigning his commission at the rank of Captain.

Qualifications and awards 
Laughton attended the University of Westminster as a Post-Graduate student, graduating in 1993 with a Diploma in Management Studies. In 1995 The Royal Geographical Society selected him for the Ness Award in 2005 for "Leadership of expeditions and encouragement of others". After joining the Institute of Directors in 2007, he was awarded the institute's Certificate of Company Direction in 2011.

Career

Early business career 
Following his military career Laughton held several management roles within the construction industry before moving into self employment from which his entrepreneurial activities stemmed.

Entrepreneurial activities 
In 1994 Laughton founded Office Projects Group Limited as chairman with Andrew Russell as commercial director. OPL managed and delivered commercial interior and exterior fit-out and refurbishment projects for a range of blue-chip UK customers and was acquired by Balfour Beatty in 2011. Since then he has held non executive director roles as well as founding the Business Leadership Academy, co-founding Brighton City Airways (City Airways) and is founder and managing director of Laughton & Co Ltd.

Charity 
Through his expeditions Laughton has raised funds to support charitable causes, these have included Great Ormond Street Hospital, the Royal National Lifeboat Institution, Community Action Nepal and Global Angels.  He has founded and directed a number of events for charities including the annual Great Sussex Bath Race, the Rockinghorse Sportathlon and Speedee Boarding.  These events are all held in support of Sussex Based charities Chestnut Tree House, LifeCentre  Rockinghorse and Heart.

Laughton is currently Chairman of the Scientific Exploration Society a charity founded by John Blashford-Snell in 1969 (Charity no. 267410), a role he has held since 2018.

Associations 

Laughton founded the Penny Farthing Club in 2013 and has been club secretary since its creation.

Expeditions 
Laughton's first expedition was a three-day canoe journey in Somerset with a school friend aged thirteen. He has continued to organise and lead adventurous journeys on seven continents, by land, sea and air. He has completed the Explorers Grand Slam and led more than 50 expeditions to remote parts of the world.

Seven Summits 
Over the course of nine years, Laughton successfully climbed the highest mountains on each of the seven continents, known as the seven summits.  The first summit he reached was Acongacua in 1991 and he completed the challenge in 2000 in Antarctica on Mount Vinson.  During this undertaking he raised money for Great Ormond Street Hospital.

 Aconcagua - January 1991
 Kilimanjaro - July 1992
 Denali - May 1993
 Elbrus - February 1994
 Carstenz (Puncak Jaya) - April 1995
 Everest - May 1998
 Vinson - January 2000

Mount Everest, Nepal
Laughton has taken part in five expeditions on Mount Everest.

1996 
During his first Mt Everest expedition in the spring of 1996 Laughton did not reach the summit.  He was amongst the climbers caught in the "worst storm in 100 years" whilst at an altitude of  9–11 May 1996.

1998 
In 1998, Laughton returned to Mt Everest leading an expedition team that includes the young Bear Grylls.  They successfully reached the  summit of Mt Everest on 26 May 1998, at which point Bear is the youngest Briton to achieve this.

2003 
In 2003, Laughton led an expedition to help wheelchair-bound explorer Glenn Shaw achieve his life's ambition of seeing Mount Everest from Base Camp.  Shaw had a medical condition known as 'Brittle Bones' and was confined to a wheelchair all of his life.  The team successfully reached Base Camp on the north side of the mountain.

2007 
In 2007 Laughton returned to Everest with Bear Grylls as Team Leader of "Mission Everest". This record-setting parajet paramotor flight eventually reached an altitude of  flying higher than all the Himalayan peaks and raised £1 million for the charity Global Angels.

2015 
During an expedition to set the record for the World's Highest Dinner Party, Laughton and his team are on the north side of Everest in Tibet at an altitude of  during the devastating earthquake of 2015. The record attempt is abandoned as the team successfully descend from high altitude to help with the rescue efforts.

2018 
This expedition raised over £100,000 for the charity Community Action Nepal.

Circumnavigations 
Laughton holds a number of records for completing first circumnavigations by jet ski and paddle board.  In 2000 Laughton was with the first team to circumnavigate the British Isles on a jet-ski.  This 30 day project raised funds for the RNLI.  This was followed in 2017 by the first jet ski circumnavigation of Ireland again in aid of the RNLI and Help for Heroes.  Later in 2017, Laughton led a team of paddle-boarders in the first circumnavigation by stand up paddle board of Easter Island in the Pacific in November 2017.

Greenland 
In 2005 Laughton led an expedition in Greenland and achieves twelve first ascents of previously unclimbed peaks as well as making and ascent of Gunnbjørn Fjeld the highest mountain north of the Arctic Circle.

Sky Car 
In 2009 Laughton undertook a mission to pilot the world's first road legal flying car on a  journey by land and air from London to Timbuktu across the Sahara for charity Alive & Kicking.  Leaving Knightsbridge on 9 January the team completed the expedition on 25 February 2009.  The Parajet Skycar was driven where there were roads available and flown where they were not, notably over the Straits of Gibraltar.

Polar Expeditions 
Laughton has undertaken a number of polar expeditions.  Three are of particular note and the last degree expeditions to both poles completed his explorers grand slam.

In 1999 Laughton skis the Last Degree to the North Pole, the last  to the North Pole, raising money for the Starlight Children's Charity.

The Shackleton Memorial Expedition led by Laughton took place in 2001 in Antarctica.  The expedition planned to retrace Shackleton's traverse of South Georgia.  The expedition took three and a half days to traverse the mountain terrain in atrocious weather conditions raising money for James Caird Trust

To mark the 100th anniversary of Captain Scott's arrival at the South Pole in 1912, Laughton led an expedition to ski the Last Degree to the South Pole.  When they reached the Pole Laughton organised the first official game of cricket at Pole with the British team winning by two wickets against the "rest of the world" in this commemorative game

Bering Strait
In the winter of 2016 Neil Laughton and James Bingham attempted to make a crossing of the Bering Strait.  The ice was too thin to walk on and would not support their weight, but nor was it possible to paddle through in their kayaks.  They began to drift north in the ice into open ocean and had to be rescued airlifted from the ice by a United States Coast Guard helicopter who airlifted them from the ice.

Penny Farthing 
In 2013 Laughton Founded the Penny Farthing Club and is Captain of the England Penny Farthing Polo Team. He currently holds the position of Club Secretary for the Penny Farthing Club. The team had hoped to beat the world record that had been set in 1886 in Massachusetts, USA but were  short of this world record distance of 35.550 km (22 miles and 150 yards).

Laughton completed a Penny Farthing ride from Land's End to John o' Groats in the summer of 2019 with David Fox-Pitt in support of Mary's Meals and raised over £25,000 for the charity.

On 17 September 2019 Laughton managed a team of racing penny farthing riders who attempted individual world records for the furthest distance in an hour around an indoor velodrome. A new Guinness World Record was achieved by Chris Opie with a distance of 34.547 km.

On 10 October 2019 Chris Opie set a new world record for the furthest distance in one hour outdoors at Herne Hill Velodrome - 22 miles 369 yards (35.743 km). Laughton managed the team with support riders Mark Beaumont and James Lowsley-Williams.

In celebration of GWR Day on 14 November 2019 Laughton attempted three Guinness World Record titles on a penny farthing (no hands) at Preston Park velodrome in Brighton.

References

External links 
 Official Website

1963 births
Living people
English explorers
British summiters of Mount Everest
English mountain climbers
Summiters of the Seven Summits